Ring 8 and New York State Boxing Hall of Fame refers to Ring 8, a nonprofit organization located in New York City founded in 1954 by ex prize-fighter Jack Grebelsky to help former professional boxers in need of financial assistance, including housing, medical care, and funeral related expenses. Ring 8 is composed of current and ex professional, amateur, and collegiate boxers, referees, trainers, promoters and others involved in the fight game. Ring 8's current president is boxing promoter Bob Duffy, a former New York State Boxing Commissioner. The group holds monthly meetings in Long Island City at The Waterfront Crabhouse, and an annual Holiday Party in December as well as a picnic each year. Ring 8 members past and present include Rocky Graziano, Joe Miceli, Vito Antuofermo, Juan Laporte, Tony Mazzarella, Bobby Cassidy, Matt Saha, Gil Clancy, Emile Griffith, Tony Napoli, Mark Breland, Jimmy Glenn, Junior Jones, Renaldo Snipes, Vinny Madalone, Danny Giovanelli, Bill Tate, Bobby Bartels, Henny Wallitsch, Tommy Gallagher, and Sandy Sadler.
In 2012, Ring 8 founded and endowed the New York State Boxing Hall of Fame, with its inaugural induction ceremony on April 1, 2012. A Hall of Fame plaque will adorn the wall of the New York State Athletic Commission in downtown Manhattan and be updated annually.

References

External links
Official Website

Non-profit organizations based in New York City
Boxing museums and halls of fame
Halls of fame in New York City